Kari LaRaine Miller (born April 16, 1977) is an American Paralympic volleyball player.

Early life
Miller was born in Newark, New Jersey. In 1995 she graduated from Cardozo Senior High in Washington, D.C. and in 2011 began attending University of Central Oklahoma. In her spare time she likes to watch Heroes and when it comes to sports her favorite team is Minnesota Vikings. She also likes Adrian Peterson and is into equestrianism, jet skiing, parachuting, and rock climbing.

Career
Miller lost both her legs when a car she was in was hit by a drunk driver while she was on leave from military duty in 1999. She started competing for Paralympic Games in 2007 where she won a silver medal for her participation at Sitting Volleyball Invitational. In 2008, she participated at World Organization Volleyball for Disabled where she won bronze medal and the same year got another silver one for her participation at 2008 Paralympic Games in Beijing, China. In 2009, Miller was awarded as Paralympian of the year. In 2010, she won silver medal at Parapan American Championship which was held in Colorado and the same year got gold medal for another WOVD Championship. In 2011 and 2012 respectively she won three gold medals at ECVD Continental Cup, Parapan American Zonal Championship, and Volleyball Masters. She also got 4th silver medal for her participation at 2012 Paralympic Games in London.

She was part of the USA team which won the gold at 2015 Parapan American Games in Toronto, Canada.

References

External links

1977 births
Illinois Fighting Illini Paralympic athletes
Sportspeople from Newark, New Jersey
Paralympic volleyball players of the United States
Paralympic silver medalists for the United States
Medalists at the 2008 Summer Paralympics
Medalists at the 2012 Summer Paralympics
Medalists at the 2016 Summer Paralympics
Volleyball players at the 2008 Summer Paralympics
Volleyball players at the 2012 Summer Paralympics
Volleyball players at the 2016 Summer Paralympics
Living people
American sitting volleyball players
Women's sitting volleyball players
Paralympic gold medalists for the United States
University of Central Oklahoma alumni
Paralympic medalists in volleyball